|}

The Grand Cup is a Listed flat horse race in Great Britain open to horses aged four years or older.
It is run at York over a distance of 1 mile 5 furlongs and 188 yards (2,787 metres), and it is scheduled to take place each year in June.

The race was first run in 2008 and prior to 2017 it was run in late May. It was moved to a fixture in mid-June in 2018 as part of changes to European stayers' races.

Winners

See also 
Horse racing in Great Britain
List of British flat horse races

References

Racing Post:

Flat races in Great Britain
York Racecourse
Open long distance horse races
2008 establishments in England
Recurring sporting events established in 2008